Basiaeschna janata, the springtime darner, is a species of dragonfly in the monotypic genus Basiaeshna in the family Aeshnidae. It is a small, bluish darner that flies early in the year.

References

Aeshnidae
Odonata of North America
Monotypic Odonata genera
Taxa named by Edmond de Sélys Longchamps